Restoration of Independence Day may refer to:
 Day of Restoration of Independence (Azerbaijan)
 Independence Restoration Day  (Estonia)
 Day of the Restoration of Latvian Independence
 Lithuania Independence Restoration Day
 Sovereignty Restoration Day in Hawaii

Disambiguation pages